Tanichthys micagemmae is a species of freshwater ray-finned fish. It is a member of the carp family (family Cyprinidae) of order Cypriniformes. It was only discovered in 2001, in a tributary of the Bến Hải River in Quảng Bình Province, Vietnam.  Its range includes what was the demilitarized zone between North and South Vietnam and was subject to intense bombing during the Vietnam War.

It is similar in appearance to the White Cloud Mountain minnow (T. albonubes), the most familiar member of its genus, which is a commonly sold freshwater aquarium fish. T. micagemmae can be distinguished from its more familiar relative primarily by the lighter coloration of its lower body and by the centered position of its lateral stripes, compared with a position well above the middle in T. albonubes.  Some older males develop spectacular elongated dorsal and anal fins.

The species is sold in England under the common name Vietnamese cardinal minnow. It is known in Finnish as juovakardinaalikala (striped cardinal fish), kardinaalikala (cardinal fish) being the White Cloud Mountain minnow.

In the aquarium

Vietnamese cardinal minnows do best in a water temperature ranging from 19–23 degrees Celsius. Softer water within the range of 37–142 ppm is also preferable. They are peaceful, though males constantly challenge one another, harmlessly, and do well with a variety of fish, such as cyprinids, catfish, loaches, and tetras. T. micagemmae is a schooling fish and should be housed with 8-10 other specimens. Like T. albonubes  the species spawns in pairs along plants; in a well-planted aquarium adults do not seek out their eggs, nor do they harm juveniles: consequently a founder population of males and females will maintain itself indefinitely, under suitable aquarium conditions.

References 

micagemmae
Fish described in 2001
Taxa named by Jörg Freyhof